A general election was held in the U.S. state of Georgia on November 4, 2014. All of Georgia's executive officers were up for election as well as a United States Senate seat, all of Georgia's fourteen seats in the United States House of Representatives and all seats in both houses of the Georgia General Assembly. Primary elections were held on May 20, 2014. Primary runoffs, necessary if no candidate wins a majority of the vote, were held on July 22, 2014.

United States Senate

Incumbent Republican Senator Saxby Chambliss chose to retire rather than run for re-election to a third term in office.

Seven Republicans ran for their party's nomination: U.S. Representative Paul Broun, patent attorney Art Gardner, U.S. Representative Phil Gingrey, conservative political activist Derrick E. Grayson, former Secretary of State of Georgia Karen Handel, U.S. Representative Jack Kingston and Georgia Ports Authority board member David Perdue. Perdue and Kingston came first and second, respectively in the primary. As no candidate won a majority, the two proceeded to a runoff. Perdue won the runoff by a narrow margin.

Four Democrats ran for their party's nomination: former state senator Steen Miles, daughter of former U.S. Senator Sam Nunn and CEO of Points of Light Michelle Nunn, physician Branko Radulovacki and Reserve Officers' Training Corps instructor Todd Robinson. Nunn easily won the Democratic nomination with almost 75% of the vote.

United States House of Representatives

All of Georgia's fourteen seats in the United States House of Representatives were up for election in 2014.

The race in the 12th congressional district is considered by political prognosticators to be the most competitive. In addition, open seat contests in the 1st, 10th, and 11th districts featured competitive Republican primaries for seats held by retiring Republican incumbents. There was also a competitive Democratic primary in the 4th district.

Governor

Incumbent Republican Governor Nathan Deal is ran for re-election to a second term as governor.

Deal was challenged in the Republican primary by State Superintendent of Schools John Barge and Dalton Mayor David Pennington. He defeated them all, winning renomination with 72% to 17% for Pennington and 11% for Barge.

State Senator Jason Carter, a grandson of former president and former governor Jimmy Carter, was unopposed for the Democratic Party's nomination.

Lieutenant Governor
Incumbent Republican Lieutenant Governor Casey Cagle ran for re-election to a third term in office. He was unopposed in the Republican primary.

Connie Stokes, a former DeKalb County Commissioner, former state senator and candidate for Georgia's 4th congressional district in 2004 and 2010 was the Democratic nominee and was unopposed in her primary election.

General election

Polling

Results

Attorney General
Incumbent Republican Attorney General Sam Olens ran for re-election to a second term in office. He was unopposed in the Republican primary.

Greg Hecht, a former state representative, former state senator and candidate for lieutenant governor in 2006 was unopposed for the Democratic nomination.

General election

Polling

Results

Secretary of State
Incumbent Republican Secretary of State Brian Kemp ran for re-election to a second term in office. He was unopposed in the Republican primary.

Democratic primary
Gerald Beckum, the Mayor of Oglethorpe, and Doreen Carter, president of the Greater Lithonia Chamber of Commerce and a former Lithonia City Councilwoman, ran for the Democratic nomination.

Polling

Results

General election

Polling

Results

Commissioner of Agriculture
Incumbent Republican Commissioner of Agriculture Gary Black ran for re-election to a second term in office. He was unopposed in the Republican primary.

Christopher Irvin, a contractor, nominee for the State House of Representatives in 2010 and grandson of former Commissioner Tommy Irvin, ran unopposed for the Democratic nomination.

General election

Polling

Results

Insurance and Safety Fire Commissioner
Incumbent Republican Commissioner of Insurance and Safety Fire Ralph Hudgens ran for re-election to a second term in office. He was unopposed in the Republican primary.

Ted Metz qualified as the Libertarian nominee.

Democratic primary
Insurance associate and former state representative Keith Heard and retired insurance professional Liz Johnson ran for the Democratic nomination.

Polling

Results

General election

Polling

Results

Commissioner of Labor
Incumbent Republican Commissioner of Labor Mark Butler ran for re-election to a second term in office. He was unopposed in the Republican primary.

Attorney and former state representative Robbin Shipp is the Democratic nominee. She was unopposed in the primary election.

General election

Polling

Results

State Superintendent of Schools
Incumbent Republican State Superintendent of Schools John Barge did not run for re-election to a second term in office. He instead ran for governor.

Republican primary

Candidates

Declared
 Mary Kay Bacallao, Fayette County Board of Education member
 Ashley D. Bell, former Hall County Commissioner
 Mike Buck, Chief of Staff to John Barge and former administrator of the Rome City School District
 Sharyl Dawes, teacher and former Chairman of the Gwinnett County Republican 
 Allen Bowles Fort, superintendent of the Quitman County School District
 Nancy Jester, actuarial accountant and former DeKalb County School Board member
 Fitz Johnson, businessman
 Kira Willis, teacher and Libertarian nominee for superintendent in 2010
 Richard Woods, Republican candidate for superintendent in 2010

Withdrew
 Matt Schultz, Bartow County School Board member (endorsed Johnson)

Declined
 John Barge, incumbent State Superintendent of Schools (ran for Governor)

Polling

Results

Runoff
Buck and Woods advanced to the runoff, which Woods won by 199,453 votes to 198,740. As his 713-vote margin of victory was less than 1%, a recount was considered likely. Buck duly requested one on July 29 and two days later, Woods was confirmed as the winner after Buck only narrowed the margin by 13 votes.

Democratic primary

Candidates

Declared
 Tarnisha Dent, teacher
 Denise Freeman, consultant and advocate
 Jurita Forehand Mays, teacher
 Alisha Thomas Morgan, State Representative and non-profit director
 Rita Robinzine, teacher and candidate for the State House of Representatives in 2008
 Valarie Wilson, former president of the Georgia School Boards Association and former City Schools of Decatur Board member

Polling

Results

Runoff
Wilson and Morgan advanced to a runoff, which Wilson won handily.

General election

Polling

Results

Public Service Commission
Two members of the five-person Georgia Public Service Commission were up for election.

District 1
District 1 incumbent Republican Herman D. "Doug" Everett ran for re-election.

Libertarian John Monds, the nominee for the seat in 2008 and the nominee for Governor in 2010 qualified as the Libertarian nominee to oppose Everett, who had no Democratic opponent.

General election

Polling

Results

District 4
District 4 incumbent Republican Lauren McDonald ran for re-election to a second consecutive and third overall term in office.

Business manager and candidate for the State House of Representatives in 2008 Daniel Blackman was unopposed for the Democratic nomination in District 4. Aaron Gilmer was the Libertarian nominee.

Republican primary
He was opposed in the Republican primary by attorney Doug Kidd and insurance agent and Hall County Commissioner Craig Lutz.

Results

General election

Polling

Results

Georgia General Assembly

References

 
Georgia